Islands of Refreshment was the name given to Tristan da Cunha by its self-proclaimed ruler, Jonathan Lambert, in 1811.

History
In the early 19th century American whalers frequented the neighboring waters and, on December 27, 1810, the Boston ship Baltic put ashore an American named Jonathan Lambert "late of Salem, mariner and citizen thereof" along with one Thomas Currie or Tomasso Corri in his employ, and a third man named Williams. These three were the first permanent inhabitants of Tristan, and they were soon joined by a fourth, Andrew Millet.

Lambert declared himself sovereign and sole possessor of the island group "grounding my right and claim on the rational and sure ground of absolute occupancy". He renamed the main island "Island of Refreshment", Inaccessible Island "Pintard Island" and Nightingale Island "Lovel Island". Five months after arriving, Lambert, Williams and Millet drowned while fishing on May 17, 1812. Currie was joined, however, by two other men, and the three busied themselves growing vegetables, wheat and oats, and breeding pigs.

During the War of 1812, the islands were used as a base by American cruisers sent to prey on British merchant ships. This and other considerations urged by Lord Charles Henry Somerset, then-governor of Cape Colony in South Africa, led the British government to annex the islands as dependencies of the Cape Colony. The formal proclamation of annexation was made on August 14, 1816, partly as a measure to ensure the French could not use the islands as a base for a rescue operation to free the deposed Napoleon I of France from his prison on Saint Helena.

References

History of Tristan da Cunha
Former unrecognized countries
Former monarchies of Africa
Island countries
Micronations
States and territories established in 1811
States and territories disestablished in 1816
Former countries in Africa
Self-proclaimed monarchy

fr:Tristan da Cunha (archipel)